Manchester Regional Arena is a multipurpose stadium in Manchester, England, primarily used for athletics, football and rugby league.

History
It was originally developed as the warm-up track for the 2002 Commonwealth Games held at the adjacent City of Manchester Stadium. It has hosted the AAA Championships and Paralympic World Cup, and was the reserve home ground of the Manchester City reserve team prior to moving to Ewen Fields in June 2010. It also served as the home of the Manchester City Ladies' side until their move to the adjacent Academy Stadium in the Etihad Campus in 2014.

With both Manchester City teams moving out of the ground by the beginning of 2015, their tenure was replaced by amateur rugby league side Manchester Rangers.

References

2002 Commonwealth Games
Athletics (track and field) venues in England
Manchester City F.C.
Sports venues in Manchester
Sports venues completed in 2002
2002 establishments in England